Round table primarily refers to the Central Round Table (Zentraler Runder Tisch), a series of meetings during the Peaceful Revolution in East Germany in late-1989 and early-1990.

The Round table first convened in East Berlin on 7 December 1989, the day after Egon Krenz had resigned as the head of the Socialist Unity Party (SED) government. This Round Table, modeled after the Polish Round Table convened in April 1989, was initiated by the group Democracy Now. "Round table" was to be understood in a metaphorical sense, meaning that the participants were on a par with each other. Physically, the table was rectangular (unlike the Polish model which was literally round). It was set up as a forum in which members of East German government-aligned organizations (such as the so-called bloc parties, trade unions, etc.) came together with representatives of the new citizens’ movements (such as Democracy Now, Democratic Awakening, and New Forum) to discuss and advance reforms in the German Democratic Republic (East Germany), advising the executive until free elections could be held. 

There were 39 representatives at the Central Round Table, 33 of whom were entitled to vote. Seventeen of them represented new oppositional groups and political parties, and sixteen were from political parties and organizations that had been part of the communist-dominated East German government. Three, representing women, consumers and environmentalists, had observer status. The final three members were the moderators, all clergymen, from the Protestant, Catholic and Methodist churches, who did not have a vote. At first most participants hoped to reform the East German government and thus retain the country’s independence, but as popular opinion moved towards rapid unification with West Germany, these hopes were dashed. 

The Round Table's first three meetings, held on 7, 18 and 22 December 1989, took place in the Protestant church's Bonhoeffer House near Friedrichstraße in Berlin-Mitte. Because popular interest created a need for more space, from the fourth meeting on 27 December to the sixteenth and final meeting on 12 March 1990, the Round Table met in the conference building of the SED-dominated Council of Ministers in Ossietzky St. near Schönhausen Palace in Berlin-Pankow. 

During the first meeting the Round Table decided to dissolve the "Office for National Security" (the organization that succeeded the Stasi), to hold free elections for the East German Parliament (Volkskammer) on 6 May 1990 (in January the election was preponed to 18 March 1990), and to draft a new constitution, a project that was completed by a subcommittee and presented on 4 April 1990, but never discussed by the newly elected Volkskammer. 

Modeled after this Central Round Table, many local round tables were set up in cities and towns across East Germany. In general they continued to exist until the May 6, 1990 local elections constituted new local governments.

References

Bibliography 
 Timothy Garton Ash, We the People: The Revolution of '89 Witnessed in Warsaw, Budapest, Berlin and Prague (London 1999)
 André Hahn, Der Runde Tisch: das Volk und die Macht – politische Kultur im letzten Jahr der DDR (Berlin 1998)
 Uwe Thaysen (ed.), Der Zentrale Runde Tisch der DDR: Wortprotokoll und Dokumente 4 vols. (Wiesbaden 2000)
 Uwe Thaysen, Der Runde Tisch. Oder: Wo blieb das Volk? (Opladen 1990)

External links 
 Captioned image of the first Central Round Table meeting at germanhistorydocs.ghi-dc.org.
 Image of some members at the Jan. 22, 1990 Round Table meeting at germanhistorydocs.ghi-dc.org.
 Goals of the Central Round Table by Democratic Awakening, at germanhistorydocs.ghi-dc.org.
 Zentraler Runder Tisch article on the website of the  Deutsches Historisches Museum

Politics of East Germany
History of East Germany
1989 establishments in East Germany
1990 disestablishments in East Germany
East Berlin
1989 in Berlin
1990 in Berlin
1989 conferences
1990 conferences